Mysticons is an animated television series that aired from August 28, 2017 to September 15, 2018. The show is a collaboration between companies Nelvana, Playmates Toys, and The Topps Company. The show was created by Sean Jara, who is also the executive story editor and producer.

In August 2018, Jara confirmed on Twitter that Mysticons was not renewed for any episodes beyond its initial 40-episode production order. The final episode of the series, "Age of Dragons", aired on September 15, 2018 in the U.S. and September 23, 2018 in Canada.

Synopsis
The series is set in the mystical world of Gemina and in its capitol called Drake City, following the adventures of four teenage girls who are chosen by the all-powerful Dragon Disk to become legendary heroes known as the Mysticons. Arkayna, Emerald, Zarya and Piper undertake an arduous quest to find four spellbooks and animal-themed bracers of mystical power to form the Codex. This will grant them their full strength and abilities necessary to save their world from Dreadbane, who seeks to release Necrafa, the leader of the Spectral Hand and Queen of the Undead. When Necrafa is freed she betrays Dreadbane and throws him into where she was banished by Imani Firewing, the original Mysticon Dragon Mage, a millennium ago.

The second generation of Mysticons encounter various allies and adversaries, while finding out that Princess Arkayna has a long-lost fraternal twin sister, a prophecy foretelling inevitable annihilation, and the blue-green birth gem of a top-level Astromancer, by the name of Proxima Starfall, who is ultimately revealed to have been nothing but a scapegoat and proxy for the sarcastic and feisty Zarya Moonwolf the second Mysticon Ranger.
When the twin stars unite
The spectral beast will take flight
Its roars will heard a new dark age
And the realm will be
Purged by the dragon's rage
Additionally, Princess Arkayna and her twin obtain two rings which transform them into the "Twin Dragon," allowing them to destroy the Spectral Dragon and the Queen of the Undead in one fell swoop, leaving nothing but half of her evil ancient mask behind.

In the show's second and final season, the Mysticons are enjoying their lives, but are pulled back into their heroic duties to destroy the remaining half of Queen Necrafa's evil mask, which is later worn by one of their former friends who was thought to be Princess Arkayna Goodfey's long-lost twin, sister who becomes their adversary as a result of the fact that she was nothing but a decoy (proxy) for Zarya Moonwolf. As such, she feels deeply betrayed by Princess Arkayna for obliviously abandoning her for Zarya, becomes the new leader of the Spectral Hand with the reluctant help of powerful mages known as Astromancers whom she turns into her mindless minions "Spectromancers" and manages to create the Dark Codex by snatching the powerless Dragon Disk and corrupting it fully. To aid her in getting her revenge on the Mysticons for ruining her life, especially Princess Arkayna, she creates the Vexicons who are a bit more powerful than the Mysticons.

Upon realizing the stronger evil hold the Mask fragment has on her, Proxima tends to toss it into the Rift of Ruin. However, the Mask attaches itself to her face and takes full possession of her mind and body, stating that it has been reborn for one purpose- To destroy the realm of Gemina! The Mysticons go into her mind, with help from Tazma, to find a spell that can release Proxima from the Mask's full-blown influence. Princess Arkayna then realizes just how terrible a sister she was towards Proxima, that her not being there for her when she needed her most was the very motivation for Proxima's current actions. Once Proxima is free, Princess Arkayna saves her twin sister figure from being killed by Mallory's ice blast. Mallory and her fellow Vexicons leave, and Mallory dons the remaining half of the Mask.

At the Island, the Vexicons prepare for the emergence of the Spectral Hand itself, so they can all get a taste of its evil mojo and dominate all of Gemina. Meanwhile, Proxima explains the origins of the Spectral Hand and how Queen Necrafa came to be as well as Dreadbane. Proxima undoes the dark spell she herself had cast on the Astromancers, giving her and the Mysticons an advantage against the Vexicons. Everyone flees to regroup in Emerald's home. Nova Terron mentions magical lances that could enhance the Mysticons' bracers attack power enough to eradicate the Spectral Hand for good, but that the plans to create them are in Queen Goodfey's necklace. As Dreadbane refuses to reverse the curse on the King and Queen, the Mysticons head to the palace to get the bone statues themselves but are caught by Mallory. The petrified forms of Princess Arkayna and Zarya's mother and stepfather are saved from destruction by none other than Dreadbane. In a skirmish, General Bane is fatally hurt but manages to use the last of his strength to revive the Queen and King.

Princess Arkayna happily hugs her mother, who she then introduces to Zarya Moonwolf whom addresses the Queen as "Mom." Having given the plans (off-screen), the Mysticons create their own mystical Lance of Justice in the Forge Room of the dwarfs. Queen Goodfey accompanies the Mysticons on their ultimate quest to defeat the Vexicons and obliterate the Spectral Hand, riding with Zarya on Archer; much to Princess Arkayna's annoyance and envy. However, the Spectral Hand suddenly changes and releases itself from the ancient pillar of ruins that had imprisoned it. Zarya suddenly realizes that the Spectral Hand may be vulnerable to the Dragons of Light. Returning to Dragonhenge, the Mysticons and Queen Goodfey meet up with Stormy and King Valmuk who tells the Mysticons that the only way that his ever-growing kind can help is to reach full adulthood by going into the Ever Realm, as time flows faster there. Reaching the Valley of Shooting Stars, they are caught by the Vexicons. Eartha is conflicted about crushing the dragon eggs and has a full change of heart. She humiliates Mallory by destroying her ice-white hair, giving the dragon eggs time to grow. With their dragon mounts, the Mysticons utilize their bracers to obliterate the Spectral Hand from existence and release those it trapped.

With Planet Gemina finally at peace, life returns to normal in Drake City and the rest of the realm. Emerald has Eartha living with her at Ruddix Hollow, King Darius and Queen Goodfey resume their royal duties and have the Vexicons imprisoned, Nova Terron steps down as topmost star master of the Astromancer Academy to be with his longtime starmate/girlfriend Geraldine and gives the honor to Proxima Starfall as compensation for having an unintentional hand in ruining the orphan mage's life, presenting her with the powerless Codex and untainted gold Dragon Disk. Riding their dragon mounts, the Mysticon "sisters" continue their duties to bring peace, love and justice to the realm.

Cast and characters

 Alyson Court as Princess Arkayna Goodfey
 Nicki Burke as Zarya Moonwolf
 Ana Sani as Piper Willowbrook
 Evany Rosen as Emerald Zirconia Goldenbraid
 Amy Matysio as Mallory
 Katie Griffin as Kitty Boon
 Joshua Graham as Kasey Boon
 David Berni as Acting King Gawayne
 Dan Lett as Nova Terron
 Michelle Monteith as Tazma Grimm
 Stacey DePass as Proxima Starfall
 Deven Christian Mack as Malvaron Grimm, Ferrus Goldenbraid, and General Dreadbane
 Linda Kash as Kymraw and Queen Goodfey
 Doug Hadders as Douglaphius "Doug" Hadderstorm
 Valerie Buhagiar as Queen Necrafa
 Julie Lemieux as Serena Snakecharmer
 Athena Karkanis as Imani Firewing and Quasarla
 Cory Doran as Neeko
 Paul Soles as Barnabas Dinklelot (3 episodes)
 Denise Oliver as Citrine Goldenbraid and Queen Truefin
 Cedric Smith as King Valmuk
 Neil Crone as Malachite Goldenbraid
 Rob Tinkler as Halite Goldenbraid
 Talia Pearl as Princess Kelpie Truefin ("Clash of the Tridents" and "The  Mask")
 Jamie Waston as Captain Kaos ("Mutiny Most Fowl")
 Catherine Disher as Hortensia Q. Sparklebottom (3 episodes)
 Barbara Mamabolo as Vesper
 Bahia Watson as Kasha (10 episodes)
 Alana Bridgewater as Eartha (10 episodes)
 Patrick McKenna as King Darius (7 episodes)

Artifacts, weaponry, objects, and abilities
 
There are many magical artifacts, objects, weaponry, and abilities within the Mysticons series. Most prominently is the Dragon Disk, a supremely powerful artifact that is sentient and has a will of its own. It previously belonged to the original Mysticons and became dormant after their sacrifice to stop Queen Necrafa, with  Mysticons later trying to make an exact duplicate of the Disk from four items gathered across the realm. There is also the Codex, an ancient and powerful tome that is the main source of the Mysticons' strength and abilities. It was split into four separate books of spells, along with mystic bracers, and scattered across Gemina for safekeeping. In addition to its four spellbooks, each Mysticon dons a jeweled bracer that represents their own animal, such as Arkayna's Dragon Bracer, Piper's Phoenix Bracer, Zarya's Wolf Bracer, and Emerald's Unicorn Bracer. There are a number of other magical objects in the show, like Queen Necrafa's Necklace, the Mask of the Spectral Hand (later worn by Proxima), and The Dark Codex. Apart from this, there are various forms of magical weaponry that are wielded by the Mysticons. This includes the Dragon Mage Staff which is wielded by the Dragon Mage, the Ranger Bow and Arrow which is wielded by the Mysticon Ranger, the Striker Energy Hoops which is wielded by the Mysticon Striker, the Knight Star Sword which is wielded by the Mysticon Knight, and the Knight Energy Shield which is wielded by Emerald. The evil doppelgangers of the Mysticons, the Vexicons, have their own weapons as well, apart from Willia, who does not use an actual weapon but only her abilities. Specifically, Mallory has a Crystal Ice Staff, Kasha has Feline Energy Claws, and Eartha has a Hammer. Additionally, Mallory uses a light blue Snake Bracer, Kasha uses an orange Panther Bracer, Willa uses a light purple Bat Bracer, and Eartha uses a dark pink Basilisk Bracer. These are not the only weapons uses in the show. The merpeople use the extremely powerful Silver Trident which can emit lightning bolts of white electric energy and erect a transparent dome-shaped shield, Queen Necrafta uses a long thing skeletal scepter with a red crystal orb in its center, while the Mysticons, at one point, use the Lances of Justice to increase their bracers' attack power only temporarily.

The Mysticons possess a variety of unique superpowers and abilities, some of which are psionic/psychic/extrasensory, while others are what fairies and pixies possess. While the special abilities of Zarya Moonwolf and Emerald Goldenbraid were never revealed in the show, the telekinesis ability of Mysticon Dragon Mage (currently Princess Arkayna Goodfey) is revealed, as is the Pixie Blast attack, a fairy-related special power of Piper Willowbrook as the second Mysticon Striker. This power results in her emitting a stream of bright yellow, glittery fairy dust from her hands which dazzles her enemies from a distance.

Production
In June 2015 it was reported that Nelvana, a Canadian production company, was partnering with US Nickelodeon to create the series, with the latter broadcasting the show, and Nelvana beginning production later in 2015. At the same time, both companies were said to be working with The Topps Company, while Michael Eisner and Noel Bright of the latter are executive producers, as are Colin Bohm, Doug Murphy, and Irene Weibel of Corus Entertainment. By June 2016, the show had been picked up for 40 episodes. Weibel, as the manager of the development slate at Nelvana, served as executive producer as a result on Mysticons and other shows produced by the studio like Mike the Knight, Disney's Lucky Duck and Hotel Transylvania. In addition, Sean Jara would be the show's creator, writer, and executive story editor. The show was later promoted as a "genre-defining action series" before its release.

Themes
The show is female-centered, as opposed to "many male-centered series" for younger viewers while focusing on magic, superpowers, and the classic good vs. evil dichotomy. As such, the series has elves primarily in the form of 110-year-old protagonist Piper Willowbrook, whose elvish name is Pyperia Ashryn Elvaniski, but also in the case of Hortensia Q. Sparklebottom, and princesses like Princess Arkana Goodfey and Zarya Moonwolf, who are both protagonists who were separated at birth. Furthermore, the series has a focus on the undead For instance, villain and undead sorceress, Queen Necrafa, is a lich, which is a type of undead creature. Her power is suggested to originate from the spectral hand, a reign of evil that started from a witch seeking district powers. Due to the focus on magic and fantasy, the series has been compared to the upcoming Crunchyroll Original, High Guardian Spice by some critics. The series was promoted by Nelvana as focusing on "girls’ strength, power, and courage" while other reviewers said it promotes "strong, confident, smart and funny girls." One reviewer described the first graphic novel offshoot based on the series as a "contemporary urban fantasy" which can also apply to the animated series.

LGBT representation

In October 2017, it was reported that a kiss between two female characters, Zarya Moonwolf and Kitty Boon, on the show was in danger of being cut. Despite this, the show showed the "development of a female-female romance," between Zarya, a protagonist, and her childhood friend, Kitty, known as "MoonBoon," culminating in romantic moments. In August 2018, the show's creator, Sean Jara, confirmed the two as a couple, noting that only one version of the episode was created and that the show's creative team fought for a kiss, but lost even though they managed "to keep the integrity of the love story." Jara also said there is a "beautiful love story" between Zarya and Kitty in the show, referring to the interactions between the two characters in episode 37 ("The Princess and the Pirate"), stated the importance of showing "love between LGBTQ characters on TV," and said that the kiss was cut from the episode because of "systemic homophobia" in the kids television industry, crediting Rebecca Sugar for making strides. He opined on the continual battle for more LGBTQ representation, cited an Entertainment Weekly article about LGBTQ representation in cartoons, and praised the battles for more representation which go on behind the scenes. He said this saying that Nick did not pick up the show for more than 40 episodes and, once again, confirmed Kitty and Zarya as a lesbian couple. In September, Jara said that they treated the relationship between Kitty and Zarya "like all the other relationships in the show." He added that while he was nervous and aware of possible roadblocks, Matt Ferguson, the show's director, supported it, as did his writing team. Ferguson argued that pushback came from not from people who were "evil" but rather from those who were "trying to do the best job at their particular job."

In June 2021, Abbey White of Insider reported that when the show's studio changed the series to center on four teenage girls, Jara brought in more women and queer writers to the show's writing team, who were "responsible for building out an arc between lesbian characters Zarya Moonwolf and Kitty Boon," which fans gave the shipping name of "MoonBoon." Jara recalled that he sent in the script for a kiss of the two character to the show's studios, and Nickelodeon, and fellow producers working on the show. But, the moment never aired, despite support from Nickelodeon, because a partner was concerned that the storyline was not "age-appropriate" for young viewers. As a result, despite Jara's attempts to convince the partner, the creative team had to scrap the kiss, and almost had to unravel the whole love story between Zarya and Kitty, but Jara fought for its inclusion. In the article, Nelvana confirmed that the decision to remove the kiss was made during production of the show's Season Two, and said that they were committed to having "creative storytelling with diversity and inclusion at the forefront" when it comes to BIPOC and LGBTQ representation."

Staff and cast
From 2014 to 2017, Stevie Vallance was based in Toronto as the Voice Director of the series. The principal voice cast includes Alyson Court as Princess Arkayna Goodfey, Evany Rosen as Emerald Goldenbraid, Nicki Burke as Zarya Moonwolf, and Ana Sani as Piper Willowbrook. In terms of recurring characters, David Berni was Gawayne the Great, Katie Griffin was Kitty Boon, Linda Kash was Queen Goodfey and Kymraw, and Dan Lett was Nova Terron.

In March 2018, the show was nominated for various awards at the 6th Canadian Screen Awards. This included one for Matt Ferguson, who directed the episode "Scourge of the Seven Skies" and another for Sean Jara, who wrote the episode "Sisters in Arms." While Ferguson did not get an award, Jara won an award for his writing on the aforementioned episode. The following year, another episode Jara wrote, "The Princess and the Pirate," was nominated for an award as the 7th Canadian Screen Awards. The same year, Ana Sani was nominated for the "Outstanding Performance – Female Voice" ACTRA Award for her role in the episode "The Edge of Two Morrows." Also that year, Elize Morgan, a writer who worked on Mysticons, would be a juror for the Toronto Animation Arts Festival International. Apart from Morgan, Jocelyn Geddie, Steph Kaliner, and Corey Liu were writers on the show.

Character design
Some stated that some characters may be inspired by past animations, like She-Ra: Princess of Power, with Dreadbane looking like Hordak and Choko looking like Kowl. Others stated that the series tapped into the "magical girl revival."

Music
In March 2018 the show was nominated for three awards at the 6th Canadian Screen Awards. One of these was for Christian Szczesniak's music in the episode "The Coronation." In November of the 2018 it was reported that singer Dulce Lopez sang the Spanish language version of the Mysticons theme song. In January 2020, the Canadian pop supergroup Girl Pow-R was handpicked to re-create, and sing, the show's theme song.

Episodes

Promotion and release
Mysticons was originally aimed at boys but switched its focus to girls aged 6 to 11 during the development process. Nelvana's Andrew Kerr explained in 2016 that the show's developers agreed that "at this moment in time the project would be better served if we had female protagonists."

On June 16, 2018, Universal Pictures Home Entertainment and Elevation Pictures released the first DVD volume in Canada containing episodes 1–6 on June 19, 2018, under the name "New Heroes Rise." In August of that year, Lisa Godfrey, Vice-President of original content of Corus, used the show as an example, noting that not only do they make money "from a U.S. broadcast deal with Nickelodeon," merchandising sales, partnerships with companies like Burger King and other money from owning the intellectual property related to the series, saying this model is profitable.

Telecast
In mid-August 2017, Nickelodeon unveiled the series with a trailer and "character featurettes." Then, on the week starting August 28, 2017, Mysticons premiered on Nickelodeon, in the U.S., through a five-day event over the week, before moving to its regular Sunday morning timeslot. Mysticons then began airing on Nicktoons on August 30. Premieres moved to that network with the show's second airing season on January 13, 2018. Reruns also aired on Nick Jr. and TeenNick. During the show's entire run, it was broadcast by Nickelodeon in the U.S., on Nicktoons in Central and Eastern Europe, and on Nick Jr. It also airs on CITV, the children's television strand of ITV in the United Kingdom, by Nickelodeon in Canada, Nicktoons in Germany, and Nickelodeon in Spain and Portugal, and on Nicktoons in Poland from 2018 to Present.

In Canada, the series premiered on YTV through a similar five-day event on August 28, 2017 before moving to its Sunday timeslot on September 3, 2017, replacing the series Nerds and Monsters on The Zone programming block. Repeats began airing on Nickelodeon and Teletoon on September 9. In the French-language Canada, a five-day preview aired on Télétoon between September 4 and 8, before moving to its regular slot on September 9. In October 2017, the show returned to Nickelodeon in the United States.

Printed media and merchandise
Prior to the show's debut, Nelvana launched a YouTube channel for Mysticons on July 19, 2017. The web content was produced by Blue Ant Media.

Since the animated show aired on Nickelodeon, on August 28, 2017, an ever-expanding series of graphic novels/comic books have been released once or twice a year. Unlike other popular shows and graphic novels (W.I.T.C.H., Avatar: The Last Airbender, Avatar: The Legend of Korra) none have any titles but is merely seen as the volume number. Volume 1 was released at that time, followed by Volume 2 was on May 21, 2019, and Volume 3 in late 2019, with each depicting original adventures that never occurred in the animated series. Then, in October 2017, Nelvana launched the "Piper Parkour" browser game and the free-to-play iOS and Android Mysticons: Secrets of Gemina mobile game. In December 2017, a second browser game, "Arkayna Attack" was launched, followed by "Em's Mayhem" in February 2018 and "Cover of Night" in March 2018. All five were developed by Relish Interactive. Later in 2017, Playmates Toys released a Mysticons toyline. The Topps Company published a trading card game concurrently. A Burger King kids meal promotion ran in the United States and Canada in February and March 2018.

Macmillan Publishers launched a Mysticons novel series on June 19, 2018, with the first two titles being the show adaptation Quest for the Codex and the original adventure tale The Secret of the Fifth Mysticon. The second set, the novelization Prophecy of Evil and the original story The Stolen Magic were released on August 28, 2018. A third original novel, titled The Diamond Curse was released on January 8, 2019. Alongside the text versions, Macmillan also released audiobooks of their original stories narrated by members of the show's voice cast.

On August 15, 2018, Dark Horse Comics launched an ongoing series of graphic novels by Kate Leth and Megan Levens. Later, a miniseries of four chapter books, featuring one of the second generation of the four Mysticons as the central character was released. Emerald's tale is set sometime in the first season; whereas Princess Arkayna and Zarya's are set in the second and final season, as both mention of them being long-lost fraternal twin sisters. Three books out four were released: The Secret of the Fifth Mysticon (featuring Emerald "Em", the second Mysticon Knight), The Stolen Magic (featuring Zarya, the second Mysticon Ranger), and The Diamond Curse (featuring Princess Arkayna, the second Mysticon Dragon Mage).

Reception
Melissa Camacho of Common Sense Media praised the series as fun, but warned parents that there is "lots of fantasy violence" and some "dark images" which might "scare younger kids," but that it contains "magical creature companions," trainer, and dark forces that young fans of anime are drawn toward. She also stated that the series is not educational, but offers an "entertaining alternative to the many male-centered series" produced for those of this age group. In contrast, The Encyclopedia of Science Fiction contributor Steven Pearce gave a positive review, stating that the three story arcs of the series centers on a different villain, and stated that even though the series is set in a futuristic city, "noir tendencies of urban fantasy are avoided" with cultural influence of Earth still present, even as there are sci-fi elements. Pearce also pointed out that the show is "more action-orientated" than most shows which target young girls, stated that while the animation budget wasn't big, it was "used imaginatively" and says that while the story is fast-moving, it gains strength as it moved along, resulting in a "fun, exciting series."

Notes

References

External links
Official website
Nickelodeon website

2010s American animated television series
2010s American children's television series
2010s American science fiction television series
2017 American television series debuts
2018 American television series endings
2017 animated television series debuts
2010s Canadian animated television series
2010s Canadian children's television series
2010s Canadian science fiction television series
2017 Canadian television series debuts
2018 Canadian television series endings
American children's animated action television series
American children's animated adventure television series
American children's animated horror television series
American children's animated drama television series
American children's animated science fantasy television series
American children's animated supernatural television series
Canadian children's animated action television series
Canadian children's animated adventure television series
Canadian children's animated horror television series
Canadian children's animated drama television series
Canadian children's animated science fantasy television series
Anime-influenced Western animated television series
English-language television shows
Nickelodeon original programming
YTV (Canadian TV channel) original programming
Television series by Nelvana
Magical girl television series
2010s American LGBT-related animated television series
Parallel universes in fiction
Television about magic
Fiction about superhuman features or abilities
Fictional women soldiers and warriors
Canadian LGBT-related animated television series
LGBT speculative fiction television series
Teen animated television series